John Thomas Jackson (born 10 July 1996) is a South African rugby union player for the  in the Pro14. His usually plays as either an inside or outside centre, but he has also occasionally played fly-half in the past.

Rugby career

2009–2014 : Schoolboy rugby / SWD

He earned a provincial selection as early as primary school level, when he played as a fly-half at the Under-13 Craven Week held in Kimberley in 2009. He was the top scorer for SWD at the Under-16 Grant Khomo Week in 2012, scoring a try, seven conversions and three penalties for a total of 28 points in his three starts, at the Under-18 Academy Week in 2013, when he scored 20 points through four conversions and four penalties, and at the Under-18 Craven Week in 2014, scoring two tries, six conversions and two penalties for another 28-points haul.

At the conclusion of the 2014 Craven Week, he was also named in a South Africa Schools team hosted three matches in an Under-18 International Series. Jackson started all three matches; after featuring in a 28–13 victory over France, he scored one try in each of their matches against Wales and England.

2015 : Blue Bulls, Tuks and South Africa Under-20

After school, Jackson relocated to Pretoria, where he was amongst the Blue Bulls Academy intake prior to the 2015 season. He joined the  rugby team – the Pretoria-based university side affiliated to the Blue Bulls Academy – for their 2015 Varsity Cup campaign. After playing off the bench in two matches, Jackson established himself in the starting line-up for the remaining five matches of the season.

Jackson was named in a 37-man training squad for the South Africa national under-20 rugby union team and started for them in a friendly match against a Varsity Cup Dream Team in April 2015. He was then included in the squad that embarked on a two-match tour of Argentina. He started both of their matches against Argentina helping them to a 25–22 victory in the first match and a 39–28 victory in the second match four days later. Upon the team's return to South Africa, he was named in the final squad for the 2015 World Rugby Under 20 Championship. He started their 33–5 win against hosts Italy and their 40–8 win against Samoa in their first two pool matches. However, he dropped out of the squad for their 46–13 win over Australia in the final pool match and also didn't feature in their 20–28 loss to England in the semi-final or their third-place play-off match against France, where South Africa achieved a 31–18 win to secure third place in the competition.

Jackson returned to domestic action in South Africa, appearing in all fourteen of the ' matches in the Group A of the 2015 Under-19 Provincial Championship. While Tinus de Beer was the main goal-kicker for the team, Jackson also contributed 50 points with the boot during the competition, in addition to scoring tries against ,  (first in an away match and then in the return leg at home),  and the  during the regular season, as well as in their semi-final match against Western Province in a 30–29 victory. Jackson also played in the final, but could not help his side to winning the championship, with  winning 25–23 in Johannesburg.

2016 : Blue Bulls and South Africa Under-20

In March 2016, Jackson was again included in a South Africa Under-20 training squad, also making the cut for a reduced provisional squad named a week later.

On 10 May 2016, he was included in the final South Africa Under-20 squad for the 2016 World Rugby Under 20 Championship tournament to be held in Manchester, England. He started their opening match in Pool C of the tournament as South Africa came from behind to beat Japan 59–19, and played off the bench in their next pool match as South Africa were beaten 13–19 by Argentina. He was restored to the starting line-up for their final pool match, as South Africa bounced back from their defeat to secure a 40-31 bonus-point victory over France to secure a semi-final place as the best runner-up in the competition. He started the semi-final, as South Africa faced three-time champions England. The hosts proving too strong for South Africa, knocking them out of the competition with a 39–17 victory. Jackson also started against Argentina in the third-place play-off match, but suffered their second defeat to Argentina in the tournament, convincingly being beaten 49–19 to finish in fourth place in the competition.

Jackson was then named in their squad for the 2016 Currie Cup Premier Division.

References

South African rugby union players
Living people
1996 births
People from Hantam Local Municipality
Rugby union fly-halves
Rugby union centres
Blue Bulls players
South Africa Under-20 international rugby union players
Bulls (rugby union) players
Southern Kings players
Rouen Normandie Rugby players
Rugby union players from the Northern Cape